Constructivism in Practical Philosophy is a 2012 book edited by James Lenman and Yonatan Shemmer, presenting twelve papers on moral constructivism.

Contributors
 Michael E. Bratman
 Dale Dorsey
 Nadeem J. Z. Hussain
 Aaron James
 James Lenman
 Michael Ridge
 Yonatan Shemmer
 Robert Stern
 Sharon Street
 T. M. Scanlon
 Valerie Tiberius
 R. Jay Wallace

References

External links
 Constructivism in Practical Philosophy

2012 non-fiction books
Ethics books
Oxford University Press books
Edited volumes
Meta-ethics